Antonio Rastrelli (born 15 January 1945) is a retired Italian swimmer. He competed at the 1964 Summer Olympics in the 200 m butterfly, but failed to reach the final. He finished in sixth place in this event at the 1962 European Championships.

References

1945 births
Living people
Olympic swimmers of Italy
Swimmers at the 1964 Summer Olympics
Italian male butterfly swimmers
Italian male swimmers